Phillip Kitsing Jeanmarie (born October 6, 1978) is an American actor best known for portraying Max Cooper, the Blue Shark Ranger in Power Rangers Wild Force and as intersex villain Vincent Clarkson—son of Julian Crane and Eve Russell—on the daytime soap opera Passions from December 2006 to the series finale in 2008.

Filmography

Film
 Never Land (2000) - Lost Boy #1
 Slip (2006) - Parnell
 For the Best (2006) - G.D - Son
 For Reel (2008)
 (Un)Still Life (2008)

TV Work
 CSI: Crime Scene Investigation (2000) - Valet
 Power Rangers Wild Force (2002) - Max Cooper / Blue Shark Wild Force Ranger
 ER (2003) - Patient
 Clubhouse (2004) - Chuck
 Commander in Chief (2005) - Student at Debate
 Everwood (2005) - Pete Boroni
 Cold Case (2005) - Cedric Bubley
 Passions (December 2006 – July 2008) - Vincent Clarkson
 Crossing Jordan (2007) - Darryl Bellamy
 Workshop (Web series, Summer 2009-2011) - Adam Saltair

Video games
 Grand Theft Auto: San Andreas (2004) - Pedestrian (voice)

References

External links

Phillip Jeanmarie Official Website

1978 births
Living people
American male film actors
Male actors from Los Angeles
African-American male actors
American male television actors
21st-century African-American people
20th-century African-American people